The March 1st Movement, also known as the Sam-il (3-1) Movement (Hangul: 삼일 운동; Hanja: 三一 運動), was a significant protest movement by Korean people that called for independence from Imperial Japan and a stop to the forced assimilation into Japanese culture. It is also sometimes referred to as the Man-se Demonstrations. It is remembered as one of the earliest and largest protest movements for Korean independence, and remembered as a catalyst for future independence activities. Thirty-three Korean cultural and religious leaders issued a proclamation, supported by thousands of students and civilians in Seoul. There were over 1000 demonstrations in many other cities. These were brutally suppressed, with Korean historian Park Eun-sik reporting about 7,500 killed and 16,000 wounded, and 46,000 arrested.

Korea eventually achieved independence decades later in 1945, after the surrender of Japan in World War II.

Today, March 1st is celebrated as a national holiday in the Republic of Korea (South Korea). However, the event is not a holiday in the Democratic People's Republic of Korea (North Korea).

Background

The Samil Movement arose in reaction to the repressive nature of colonial occupation under the de facto military rule of the Japanese Empire following 1910, and was inspired by the "Fourteen Points" outlining the right of national "self-determination", which was proclaimed by President Woodrow Wilson at the Paris Peace Conference in January 1918. After hearing news of Wilson's speech, Korean students studying in Tokyo published a statement demanding freedom from colonial rule.

Former Emperor Gojong died on January 21, 1919. There was widespread suspicion that he had been poisoned, which was thought credible since previous attempts (the "coffee plot") by Kim Hong-nuik, the former Russian interpreter of the Russian Legation, were well-known.

Events in Korea

At 2 p.m. on March 1, 1919, 33 activists who formed the core of the Samil Movement convened at Taehwagwan Restaurant in Seoul; they read out loud the Korean Declaration of Independence, which had been drawn up by historian Choe Nam-seon. The activists initially planned to assemble at Tapgol Park in downtown Seoul, but chose a more private location out of fear that the gathering might turn into a riot. The leaders of the movement signed the document and sent a copy to the Governor General.

The movement leaders telephoned the central police station to inform them of their actions and were publicly arrested afterwards.

Before the formal declaration, Korea also published and broadcast the following complaints, in order to be heard by the Japanese people through papers and media:

 Discrimination by the government when employing Koreans versus Japanese people; they claimed that no Koreans held important positions in the government.
 A disparity in the quality of education being offered to Korean and Japanese people.
 Mistreatment and open disregard of Koreans by the Japanese occupiers. 
 Political officials, both Korean and Japanese, were arrogant.
 No special treatment for the Korean upper class or scholars.
 The administrative processes were too complicated and new laws were passed too frequently for the general public to follow.
 Too much forced labor that was not desired by the public.
 Taxes were too heavy and the Korean people were paying more than before, while getting the same amount of services.
 Land continued to be confiscated by the Japanese people for personal reasons.
 Korean village teachers were being forced out of their jobs because the Japanese were trying to suppress Korean culture and teachings.
 Korea's resources and labor had been exploited for the benefit for the Japanese. They argued that while Koreans were working towards development, they did not reap the benefits of their own work.

These grievances were highly influenced by Wilson's declaration of the principle of self determination as outlined in his "Fourteen Points" speech.

Massive crowds assembled in Pagoda Park, Seoul to hear a student, Chung Jae-yong, read the declaration publicly. Afterwards, the gathering formed into a peaceable procession, which the Japanese military police attempted to suppress. Special delegates associated with the movement also read copies of the independence proclamation from appointed places throughout the country at 2 p.m. on that same day.

As the processions continued to grow, the Japanese local and military police could not control the crowds. The panicked Japanese officials called in military forces to quell the crowds, including the naval forces. As the public protests continued to grow, the suppression turned to violence, resulting in Japanese massacres of Koreans and other atrocities.

Approximately 2,000,000 Koreans had participated in the more than 1,500 demonstrations. Several thousand Koreans were massacred by the Japanese police force and army. The frequently cited The Bloody History of the Korean Independence Movement by Park Eun-sik reported 7,509 people killed, 15,849 wounded, and 46,303 arrested. From March 1 to April 11, Japanese officials reported 553 people killed, and more than 12,000 arrested. They said that 8 policemen and military were killed, and 158 wounded. As punishment, some of the arrested demonstrators were executed in public.

Even as Japan suppressed the protestors, an independence activist named Yu Gwansun continued to show her demonstration of independence by waving the Korean flag and organizing independence declarations. She was arrested and tortured to death by Japanese police. Now often called "Big Sister Yu Gwansun", she is considered a national heroine in Korea.

Effects

The March 1st Movement provided a catalyst for the Korean Independence Movement, which was crucial to the spread of Korea's independence movement to other local governments, including Hoengseong. Given the ensuing suppression and hunting down of activists by the Japanese, many Korean leaders went into exile in Manchuria, Shanghai and other parts of China, where they continued their activities.  The Movement was a catalyst for the establishment of the Provisional Government of the Republic of Korea in Shanghai in April 1919. It also influenced the growth of nonviolent resistance in India and many other countries.  The Korean Liberation Army was subsequently formed and allowed to operate in China by the Nationalist Government of China. During this period, there was a mobilization of Catholic and Protestant activists in Korea, with activism encouraged among the diaspora in the U.S., China, and Russia.

The Japanese government reacted to the March 1st Movement by heightening its suppression of dissent and dismissing the Movement as the "Chosun Manse Violent Public Disorder Incident" (조선 공공 만세 폭력 사건). Governor-General Hasegawa Yoshimichi accepted responsibility for the loss of control (although most of the repressive measures leading to the uprising had been put into place by his predecessors); he was replaced by Saito Makoto. The military police were replaced by a civilian force. Limited press freedom was permitted under what was termed the 'cultural policy'. Many of these lenient policies were reversed during the Second Sino-Japanese War and World War II.

On May 24, 1949, South Korea designated March 1st as a national holiday. General Choe Hong-hui dedicated the first of the three patterns (삼일 틀 – Sam-il teul) trained by III-degree black belts of Taekwondo to the Sam-il Movement.

International reaction

United States and Korea

President Woodrow Wilson issued his Fourteen Points in January 1918. The points included… in terms of US relations with Korea, "a free, open-minded, and absolutely impartial adjustment of all colonial claims."

However, as manifested at the Paris Peace Conference of 1919, Wilson was not interested in challenging global power relations. Since Japan was one of the victors and Korea was its colony, a discussion of the status of Korea was not undertaken. In general, except for depriving the defeated Germany of its overseas colonies, the US did not interfere with any colonial empire.

In April 1919, the US State Department told the ambassador to Japan that "the consulate [in Seoul] should be extremely careful not to encourage any belief that the United States will assist the Korean nationalists in carrying out their plans and that it should not do anything which may cause Japanese authorities to suspect [the] American Government sympathizes with the Korean nationalist movement."

From April 12 to 14, 1919 the First Korean Congress was convened in Philadelphia by Philip Jaisohn in support of the independence of Korea.

Delegation
Japan violently suppressed the March First Movement. The United States remained silent. Despite this, the Korean National Association planned a three-man delegation in the United States to attend the Paris Peace Conference and attempt to represent Korea's interests. Dr. Rhee (representing Hawai'i), Rev. Chan Ho Min (representing the West Coast) and Dr. Henry Han Kyung Chung (representing the Midwest) were selected, but they were unable to attend. They encountered visa problems and feared that the delegates may not be allowed to reenter the United States.

A delegation of overseas Koreans, from Japan, China, and Hawai'i, did make it to Paris. Included in this delegation was Kim Kyu-sik (김규식), a representative from the Korean Provisional Government in Shanghai. After considerable effort, he managed to arrange passage with members of the Chinese delegation to the peace conference. He traveled on a Chinese passport and under a Chinese name in order to evade the Japanese police. The Chinese were eager for the opportunity to embarrass Japan at the international forum, and several top Chinese leaders at the time, including Sun Yat-sen, told U.S. diplomats that the peace conference should take up the question of Korean independence. Beyond that, however, the Chinese, locked in a struggle themselves against the Japanese, could do little for Korea.

The United States did not pay substantial attention to these individuals, and the delegation was blocked from official participation as Korea was classified as a Japanese colony.

The failure of the Korean nationalists to gain support from the Paris Peace Conference ended the possibility of foreign support.

Commemorations

South Korea 
The March 1st Movement is commemorated annually by South Koreans to pay respect to participants of the Korean independence movement, as well as to celebrate Korean independence. This is done by prominent display of the Flag of South Korea in businesses and homes, as well as festivals, concerts, events, and activities. The Korean Declaration of Independence is read in Tapgol Park on the day, as was done in 1919.

In 2018, President Moon Jae-in's administration established the Commission on the Centennial Anniversary of March 1st Independence Movement and the Korean Provisional Government (KPG) to celebrate these occasions. The KPG was the government-in-exile of Korea during the Japanese occupation, and a predecessor of the current government. North Korea refused to participate in the joint project of the anniversary due to "scheduling issues". The commission ceased its operation in June 2020.

Seoul Metropolitan Government stated the March 1st movement as "the catalyst movement of democracy and the republic for Korean people."

North Korea 
In the North, the day is remembered as "The People's Uprising Day", and taught as the day that Kim Il-sung's family took the lead of the independence movement. Kim would have been around eight years old around 1919. It is commemorated as a relatively minor holiday, with mostly central and few local celebrations. The events are geared towards inciting anti-American and anti-Japanese sentiment.

The epicenter of the movement is taught as being Pyongyang instead of Seoul, and the contributions of figures who became influential in the later South Korean government are downplayed. The 33 national representatives who are considered to have led the movement in the South are replaced by Kim Hyong-jik, Kim's father. Those 33 representatives are instead described as having surrendered immediately after reading their declaration. Furthermore, eight-year-old Kim is described as leading a march for some 30 li from the Mangyongdae neighborhood of Pyongyang to the Potong Gate, also in Pyongyang.

While scholars in both the South and North are in relative consensus that the movement was doomed to fail (at least in the short term), North Korean textbooks argue that the movement failed because of bourgeois interference and the lack of a central proletariat revolutionary party to lead it.

See also
History of Korea
Korean independence movement
Korean nationalism
June 10th Movement
Korea under Japanese rule
Provisional Government of Korea
Anti-Japanese sentiment in Korea
May Fourth Movement in China
Yu Gwan-sun
Refrain club
National Liberation Day of Korea

References

Further reading
 
 
 
 Hart, Dennis. "Remembering the nation: construction of the March First movement in North and South Korean history textbooks" Review of Korean Studies (Seoul) 4, no.1 (June 2001) pp. 35–59, historiography
 
 Ko, Seung Kyun. The March First Movement: A Study of the Rise of Korean Nationalism under the Japanese Colonialism Koreana Quarterly: A Korean Affairs Review (Seoul) 14, no.1-2 (1972) pp. 14–33.
 Ku, Dae-yeol.  Korea Under Colonialism: The March First Movement and Anglo-Japanese Relations (Royal Asiatic Society, Seoul, 1985) online review
 Kwon, Tae-eok. "Imperial Japan's 'civilization' rule in the 1910s and Korean sentiments: the causes of the national-scale dissemination of the March First Movement" Journal of Northeast Asian History 15#1 (Win 2018) pp. 113–142.
 Lee, Timothy S. "A political factor in the rise of Protestantism in Korea: Protestantism and the 1919 March First Movement." Church History 69.1 (2000): 116-142. online
 Palmer, Brandon.  "The March First Movement in America: The Campaign to Win American Support." Korea Journal (2020),  60#4 pp 194–216
 
 Wells, Kenneth M. "Background to the March First Movement: Koreans in Japan, 1905-1919." Korean Studies 13.1 (1989): 5-21. online

External links

Full text of Samil Proclamation of Korean Independence
Further explanation including Japanese actions and photographs
Torture Murder of  a Teenage Girl, Yu Kwan-soon
The Jeam-ri Massacre

Korean independence movement
20th century in Korea
1919 in Korea
Anti-imperialism in Korea
1919 in international relations
Protests in Korea
Massacres committed by Japan
Conflicts in 1919
1919 protests